is a former Japanese football player.

Club statistics

References

External links

1984 births
Living people
People from Kanazawa, Ishikawa
Association football people from Ishikawa Prefecture
Japanese footballers
J1 League players
J2 League players
Japan Football League players
Sanfrecce Hiroshima players
Ehime FC players
Zweigen Kanazawa players
Association football forwards